Hippopsis meinerti is a species of beetle in the family Cerambycidae. It was described by Per Olof Christopher Aurivillius in 1900.

References

Hippopsis
Beetles described in 1900